Joseph Patrick Santagato (born February 25, 1992) is an American YouTuber, comedian and podcaster. His podcast, "The Basement Yard", has reached #1 on iTunes.

Early life
Joe Santagato was born and raised in Queens, New York, United States. He is of maternal Irish descent and paternal Italian descent. His mother, Elizabeth, was a public school secretary and his father, Joseph, was a firefighter for the New York City Fire Department. He has three older siblings, Thomas, Keith and Shannon. Thomas is a former Team USA athlete and national skeleton champion, and Keith had a gaming YouTube channel from 2015 to 2017 with over 100,000 subscribers.

Santagato attended the St. Francis of Assisi Catholic School, Louis Armstrong Middle School, and St. Francis Preparatory School, where he was a Bench Warmer for the championship-winning football team. He enjoyed playing basketball. Santagato later attended Queensborough Community College but dropped out, instead working as a pizza delivery boy and waiter while growing his YouTube channel.

Santagato began to produce video content at the age of 13, focusing on short movies, sketches and song parodies. He joined YouTube after a suggestion from a friend to post videos online, using the moniker 'SantagatoTV'. 

Santagato has credited comedians like George Carlin, Richard Pryor, and Robin Williams as his major comedic influences. He has also named Jenna Marbles as an early influence on his YouTube channel.

Personal life
Santagato maintains a close relationship with several of his childhood friends, many of whom have appeared in his videos, most notably Frank Alvarez, who has co-hosted Santagato's podcast The Basement Yard since 2020.

Career
Before pursuing YouTube full-time, Santagato worked as a producer and editor for American online news platform Elite Daily, as well as appearing on MTV’s Guy Court. At this time, Santagato had a YouTube channel titled "SantagatoTV" and a popular self-titled Vine account. In May 2014, he renamed his YouTube channel to the current "Joe Santagato". His Vine account went inactive in 2016 when Vine permanently ended uploads.

In 2016, Santagato collaborated with actor and wrestler The Rock in their YouTube show titled Rock The Promo. 

In August 2016, Santagato helped to create the Hasbro board game Speak Out in which players recite phrases with a dental retractor placed in their mouth while other players try to guess the phrase which is being said. The game is based on Santagato's "Watch Ya' Mouth" series. Santagato worked with Hasbro to help promote the game on their social media. Hasbro has also released Speak Out:Joe Santagato Edition, which contains phrases written by Santagato, and is more explicit than the original version. Santagato is also a promoter of Hasbro's Hearing Things board game, based on Santagato's "Whad'ya Say" series, in which headphones are placed on one player's ears, and another player recites phrases while the first player guesses the phrase based on lip movement. 

In October 2017, Santagato announced that he had collaborated with two coworkers from his former workplace, Elite Daily, to introduce a new telecommunications company called Wing. The company uses Sprint Corporation's cellular towers and offers tiered and unlimited data options for consumers. The company is unique in the sense that customers are reimbursed for data that is not used from their selected plan during their billing cycle. Taxes are listed as "five to ten percent" of a customer's bill, based on location.

Santagato hosts a weekly podcast called "The Basement Yard." The podcast frequently features visitors such as Frank Alvarez, Anthony Davino and Danny Lopriore, and has 218,000 subscribers as of September, 2021. Frank Alvarez has since become a permanent co-host of the show. He also has a podcast with Greg Dybec titled "Other Peoples Lives", which has 80,800 subscribers as of February 2021.

In 2021, Santagato and his business partner Greg Dybec launched a new trivia party game called "Pay The Price." Their kickstarter amassed over $120,000 from over 3,000 backers.

In 2022, Santagato and Dybec released an everything-bagel hot sauce with Heatonist through their brand, Secret Handshake Food Co.

References

1992 births
Living people
People from Queens, New York
American YouTubers
21st-century American comedians
Comedians from New York City